Franz Vohwinkel (born 1964 in Munich, West Germany) is a German artist and illustrator whose work has appeared in role-playing games.

Works
Vohwinkel drew the cover art for the book Dataware (1998) for TSR's Alternity game, and illustrated cards for the Magic: The Gathering collectible card game.  He also worked for the German company Fantasy Productions on their version of the BattleTech game, producing art for the Field Manual: Mercenaries, Revised (2003), Handbook: House Steiner (2004), and Classic Battletech Master Rules, Revised Ed. (2004). Vohwinkel has done interior illustrations on a number of Dungeons & Dragons books for Wizards of the Coast, including Races of Stone (2004), Monster Manual III (2004), Complete Arcane (2004), Stormwrack (2005), Races of Eberron (2005), Complete Adventurer (2005), Tome of Magic: Pact, Shadow, and Truename Magic (2006), Power of Faerûn (2006), Fiendish Codex I: Hordes of the Abyss (2006), Player's Handbook II, and Drow of the Underdark (2007).  Other RPG work includes Realms of Sorcery (2005) and Old World Armoury (2005) for the Warhammer Fantasy Roleplay game by Black Industries, and The Four Winds (2005) for Legend of the Five Rings by Alderac Entertainment Group.

Vohwinkel also illustrated board games, including 1991's Drunter und Drüber, and 1994's Kingdoms.

References

External links

An interview with Franz Vohwinkel

1964 births
Artists from Munich
German illustrators
Living people
Role-playing game artists